The greater yellow finch (Sicalis auriventris) is a species of bird in the family Thraupidae.
It is found in Argentina and Chile.
Its natural habitats are subtropical or tropical high-altitude shrubland, temperate grassland, and heavily degraded former forest.

References

greater yellow finch
greater yellow finch
greater yellow finch
greater yellow finch
Taxonomy articles created by Polbot